Mohan Dass Naimishray is an Indian writer of Dalit ancestry.

His autobiography, Apne-Apne Pinjarey, is a well known work in Dalit literature.
Mohandas Namishray, Aamne samne by Dr. RoopChand Gautam

References

Living people
Year of birth missing (living people)
Dalit writers